Harley Island is an island located in Franz Josef Land, Arkhangelsk Oblast, Russian Federation. This island is part of the Zichy Land subgroup of the central part of the archipelago.

This island was named after Scottish physician George Harley by English Arctic explorer Frederick Jackson.

Geography
The island is quite flat, its highest point being only .

History
Fridtjof Nansen wintered on the island in 1895-1896. Umberto Cagni and Prince Luigi Amedeo of Savoy camped on the island on 13 June 1900.

See also 
 List of islands of Russia

References

External links 
Map of Jackson Island (in Russian). Red arrow indicates the position of Cap Bystrova.
 Arctic exploration

Islands of Franz Josef Land
Uninhabited islands of Russia